Edmond 003 - Sparks (TC: 星火) is a Cantopop album by Edmond Leung.

Track listing
Mars (火星)
Mr.Wrong (錯先生)
Regular Friend (普通朋友)
Electro and Flint (電光火石)
1999
Low Season (淡季)
Not Bad (未算差)
Ten Thousand and One Night (一萬零一夜)
I Heard That You Love Me (聽說你愛我)
Sparks (星火)

Charts

References

Edmond Leung albums
1998 albums